The 2016 Monster Energy FIM Speedway World Cup Race Off was the third race of the 2016 edition of the Speedway World Cup. It was run on July 29 at the National Speedway Stadium in Manchester, England and was won by Australia from Denmark, Russia and the United States. As a result, Australia progressed to the 2016 Speedway World Cup Final, where they will join defending champions and Event Two winners Sweden, hosts Great Britain and Event One winners Poland. Denmark finished second, but were eliminated from the competition along with Russia and the United States.

Jason Doyle led Australia to victory with a 15-point maximum, and he was well supported by Sam Masters and Chris Holder, while reserve Brady Kurtz scored six points after replacing the injured Max Fricke. Niels Kristian Iversen top scored with 16 points for Denmark, however his efforts were not enough as the Danes fell short of reaching the final by four points.

Results

Scores

References

See also 
 2016 Speedway Grand Prix

2016 Speedway World Cup